Peter Bainbridge may refer to:

Peter Bainbridge (footballer) (born 1958), English footballer
Peter Bainbridge (silkscreen artist) (born 1957), Australian fashion photographer